Robert Dorset was a Sixteenth-century English  priest.

Dorset was educated at Christ Church, Oxford. He was appointed Rector  of Winwick in 1572, and of Ewelme in 1574. He was Dean of Chester from 1579 until his death on 29 May 1580.

Notes

1580 deaths
16th-century English people
Deans of Chester
Alumni of Christ Church, Oxford